Malus sylvestris, the European crab apple, is a species of the genus Malus, native to Europe. Its scientific name means "forest apple" and the truly wild tree has thorns.

Description
Wild apple has an expanded crown and often appears more like a bush than a tree. Due to its weak competitiveness and high light requirement, wild apple is found mostly at the wet edge of forests, in farmland hedges or on very extreme, marginal sites.

The flowers are hermaphrodite and are pollinated by insects.

Progenitor of cultivated apples
In the past M. sylvestris was thought to be the most important ancestor of the cultivated apple (M. domestica), which has since been shown to have been primarily derived from the central Asian species M. sieversii. However another recent DNA analysis confirms that M. sylvestris has contributed significantly to the genome.

The study found that secondary introgression from other species of the genus Malus has greatly shaped the genome of M. domestica, with M. sylvestris being the largest secondary contributor. It also found that current populations of M. domestica are more closely related to M. sylvestris than to M. sieversii. However, in more pure strains of M. domestica, the M. sieversii ancestry still predominates.

Distribution and habitat
The species originates from Central Asia, in the area currently known as Kazakhstan. The tree is currently rather rare but native to most European countries. It occurs in a scattered distribution pattern as single individuals or in small groups.

Ecology
Its leaves are food of the caterpillars of the twin-spotted sphinx (Smerinthus jamaicensis) and possibly the hawthorn moth (Scythropia crataegella).

Gallery

See also
 List of Lepidoptera that feed on Malus

References

Further reading 
M.H.A. Hoffman, List of names of woody plants, Applied Plant Research, Boskoop 2005.
RHS dictionary of gardening, 1992

External links

USDA Plants Profile for Malus sylvestris
Jepson Manual (JM93) treatment of Malus sylvestris — introduced species in California.

EUFORGEN species page: Malus sylvestris. Information, distribution and related resources.

sylvestris
Crabapples
Flora of Europe
Flora of Spain
Flora of Ukraine
Taxa named by Philip Miller